A Pengelly & Co was an Australian furniture manufacturer, motor car and rolling stock body maker in Adelaide, Australia. It had a three acre factory on South Road, Edwardstown.

Between 1910 and 1912 it assembled D and E type trams for the Municipal Tramways Trust from knocked down kits manufactured by JG Brill Company in the United States. Between 1921 and 1929, it manufactured 81 F type trams followed by 30 H types.

In 1912/13, eleven Islington Railway Workshops built frames were bodied for the South Australian Railways' Holdfast Bay line. In 1913, eight trams were built for the Victorian Railways. In 1916 it was awarded a contract to body four D class dining carriages for the Commonwealth Railways. In 1924/25, eight trams were built for the State Electricity Commission of Victoria's Geelong system.

On 25 December 1913, much of the factory was destroyed in a fire. Only the factory that bodied railway carriages and trams survived.

References

Car manufacturers of Australia
Defunct furniture manufacturers
Manufacturing companies based in Adelaide
Defunct rolling stock manufacturers of Australia
Tram manufacturers
Electric vehicle manufacturers of Australia
Defunct manufacturing companies of Australia